Brian Murray Fagan (born 1 August 1936) is a prolific British author of popular archaeology books and a professor emeritus of Anthropology at the University of California, Santa Barbara.

Biography
Fagan was born in England where he received his childhood education at Rugby School. He attended Pembroke College, Cambridge, where he studied archaeology and anthropology (BA 1959, MA 1962, PhD 1965). His doctoral thesis was titled "Some Iron Age cultures of the Southern Province, Northern Rhodesia, with special reference to the Kalomo Culture". He spent six years as Keeper of Prehistory at the Livingstone Museum in Zambia, Central Africa, and moved to the USA in 1966.

Academic career
Fagan was Visiting Associate Professor of Anthropology at the University of Illinois Urbana-Champaign, in 1966/67, and was appointed Professor of Anthropology at the University of California, Santa Barbara, in 1967.

Fagan is an archaeological generalist, with expertise in the broad issues of human prehistory. He is the author or editor of 46 books, including seven widely used undergraduate college texts. Fagan has contributed over 100 specialist papers to many national and international journals. He is a Contributing Editor to Archaeology Worldwide, American Archaeology and Discover Archaeology magazines, and formerly wrote a regular column for Archaeology Magazine. He serves on the Editorial Boards of six academic and general periodicals and has many popular magazine credits, including Scientific American and Gentleman's Quarterly.

Unlike most scholars at research universities, Fagan chose to regularly teach large introductory archaeology classes to undergraduates at Santa Barbara. Avoiding traditional lecture formats, he experimented with technology to provide basic information as early as the 1970s, leaving his class periods for wide ranging discussions of interest to students. 

In conjunction with this interest in college teaching, Fagan began writing an extensive series of archaeology textbooks beginning in 1972 that are still in print in recent editions decades after their initial publication. These include In the Beginning (13th edition, 2013, with Nadia Durrani), People of the Earth (15th edition, 2018, with Nadia Durrani), Ancient North America (5th edition, 2019), Ancient Lives (7th edition, 2020, with Nadia Durrani), World Prehistory (9th edition, 2016, with Nadia Durrani), Ancient Civilizations (4th edition, 2016, with Chris Scarre), and Archaeology: A Brief Introduction (12th edition, 2016, with Nadia Durrani). 

Fagan has been an archaeological consultant for many organisations, including National Geographic Society, Time-Life, Encyclopædia Britannica, and Microsoft Encarta. He has lectured extensively about archaeology and other subjects throughout the world at many venues, including the Cleveland Museum of Natural History, the National Geographic Society, the San Francisco City Lecture Program, the Smithsonian Institution, and the Getty Conservation Institute.

In addition to extensive experience with the development of Public Television programs, Fagan was the developer/writer of Patterns of the Past, an NPR series in 1984–86. He has worked as a consultant for the BBC, RKO, and many Hollywood production companies on documentaries. In 1995 he was Senior Series Consultant for Time-Life Television's "Lost Civilizations" series. Fagan was awarded the 1996 Society of Professional Archaeologists' Distinguished Service Award for his "untiring efforts to bring archaeology in front of the public." He also received a Presidential Citation Award from the Society for American Archaeology in 1996 for his work in textbook, general writing and media activities. He received the Society's first Public Education Award in 1997.

Over the years, Fagan has written a series of well-known textbooks that provide accurate summaries of the latest advances in archaeological method and theory and world prehistory. These are designed for beginners and avoid both confusing jargon and major theoretical discussion, which is inappropriate at this basic level. His approach melds traditional cultural history with more recent approaches, with a major emphasis on writing historical narrative using archaeological data and sources from other disciplines. 

Fagan is also well known for his public lectures on a wide variety of archaeological and historical topics, delivered to a broad range of archaeological and non-archaeological audiences. He has written many critiques of contemporary archaeology and has advocated non-traditional approaches, as well as writing extensively on the role of archaeology in contemporary society. His approach is a melding of different theoretical approaches, which focuses on the broad issues of human prehistory and the past. He is a strong advocate of multidisciplinary approaches to such issues as climate change in the past.

Personal life
An avid sailor since childhood, Fagan wrote sailing guides to many locations on the Pacific coast of the United States and published them under his own imprint. Now retired from UC Santa Barbara, he lives in the Santa Barbara area with his wife, one of his two daughters, and numerous cats and rabbits.

Bibliography

 Southern Africa during the Iron Age.  London:  Thames and Hudson, 1965.
 The Rape of the Nile: Tomb Robbers, Tourists, and Archaeologists in Egypt. New York: Charles Scribner's Sons, 1975 (hardcover); Boulder, CO: Westview Press, 2004 (revised and updated ed., paperback).
 Quest for the Past: Great Discoveries in Archaeology. Boston: Addison Wesley, 1978 (paperback). (Second Edition published Long Grove, IL: Waveland Press, 1994)
 The Aztecs. W. H. Freeman and Company, 1984 (paperback).
 Clash of Cultures. New York: W.H. Freeman & Company, 1984 (paperback); Lanham, MD: AltaMira Press, 1997 (hardcover, ; paperback).
 The Adventure of Archaeology. Seattle, WA: University of Washington Press, 1985 (hardcover)
 The Great Journey: The Peopling of Ancient America. London: Thames & Hudson, 1987 (hardcover); 1989 (paperback); Gainesville, FL: University Press of Florida, 2004 (updated ed., paperback).
 Cruising Guide to California Channel Islands, Western Marine Enterprises, 1989 (paperback).
 Journey from Eden: The Peopling of Our World. London: Thames & Hudson, 1991 (hardcover).
 Ancient North America: The Archeology of a Continent. London: Thames & Hudson, 1991 (softcover).
 Kingdoms of Gold, Kingdoms of Jade: The Americas Before Columbus. London: Thames & Hudson, 1991 (hardcover).
 Snapshots of the Past. Lanham, MD: AltaMira Press, 1995 (hardcover, ; paperback).
 Time Detectives: How Scientists Use Technology to Recapture the Past. New York: Simon & Schuster, 1995 (hardcover, ; paperback).
 (editor) The Oxford Companion to Archaeology. New York: Oxford University Press (USA), 1996 (hardcover).
 (editor) Eyewitness to Discovery: First-Person Accounts of More Than Fifty of the World's Greatest Archaeological Discoveries. New York: Oxford University Press (USA), 1997 (hardcover); 1999 (paperback).
 Floods, Famines, and Emperors: El Niño and the Fate of Civilizations. New York: Basic Books, 1999 (hardcover); 2000 (paperback); London: Pimlico, 2001 (new ed., paperback)
 (editor) The Seventy Great Mysteries of the Ancient World: Unlocking the Secrets of Past Civilizations. London: Thames & Hudson, 2001 (paperback).
 The Cruising Guide to Central and Southern California: Golden Gate to Ensenada, Mexico, Including the Offshore Islands International Marine/Ragged Mountain Press, 2001 (paperback).
 The Little Ice Age: How Climate Made History, 1300–1850. New York: Basic Books, 2000 (hardcover); 2001 (paperback).
 Stonehenge. New York: Oxford University Press (USA), 2002.
 Archaeologists: Explorers of the Human Past. New York: Oxford University Press (USA), 2003 (hardcover).
 Before California: An Archaeologist Looks at Our Earliest Inhabitants. Lanham, MD: Rowman & Littlefield, 2003 (paperback); AltaMira Press, 2004 (new ed., paperback).
 Grahame Clark: An Intellectual Biography of an Archaeologist. Boulder, CO: Westview Press, 2001 (hardcover); 2003 (paperback).
 Human Prehistory and the First Civilizations (2003) The Great Courses.
 The Long Summer: How Climate Changed Civilization. New York: Basic Books, 2003 (hardcover); 2004 (paperback).
 A Brief History of Archaeology: Classical Times to the Twenty-First Century. Upper Saddle River, NJ: Prentice Hall, 2004 (paperback).
 (editor) The Seventy Great Inventions of the Ancient World. London: Thames & Hudson, 2004 (hardcover).
 Chaco Canyon: Archaeologists Explore the Lives of an Ancient Society. New York: Oxford University Press (USA), 2005 (hardcover).
 Writing Archaeology: Telling Stories About the Past. Walnut Creek, CA: Left Coast Press, 2005 (hardcover, ; paperback ).
 From Stonehenge to Samarkand: An Anthology of Archaeological Travel Writing. New York: Oxford University Press (USA), 2006 (hardcover).
 Fish on Friday: Feasting, Fasting, And Discovery of the New World. New York: Basic Books, 2007 (hardcover, ; paperback).
 The Great Warming: Climate Change and the Rise and Fall of Civilizations. New York: Bloomsbury Press, 2008 (hardcover).
 Cro-Magnon: How the Ice Age Gave Birth to the First Modern Humans. New York: Bloomsbury Press, 2010 (hardcover).
 Elixir: A Human History of Water. New York: Bloomsbury Press, 2011 (hardcover).
 The Attacking Ocean: The Past, Present, and Future of Rising Sea Levels. New York: Bloomsbury Press, 2013 .
 A Brief History of Archaeology: Classical Times to the Twenty-First Century (2017, with Nadia Durrani) Routledge
 In the Beginning (14th edition, 2020, with Nadia Durrani), Routledge
 People of the Earth (15th edition, 2018, with Nadia Durrani), Routledge
 Ancient North America (5th edition, 2019), Thames & Hudson
 Ancient Lives (7th edition, 2020, with Nadia Durrani), Routledge
 World Prehistory (9th edition, 2019, with Nadia Durrani), Routledge
 Ancient Civilizations (4th edition, 2016, with Chris Scarre), Routledge  
 Archaeology: A Brief Introduction (12th edition, 2016, with Nadia Durrani), Routledge 
 What We Did in Bed: A Horizontal History (2019, with Nadia Durrani) Yale University Press 
 Bigger Than History: Why Archaeology Matters (2019, with Nadia Durrani) Thames and Hudson 
 Climate Chaos: Lessons on Survival from our Ancestors (2021, with Nadia Durrani) Hachette 
 World Prehistory: The Basics (2021, with Nadia Durrani) Routledge 
 Archaeology: The Basics (2022, with Nadia Durrani) Routledge

Further reading
 Fagan, Brian. "Retrospect (But certainly not a necrology!)", Antiquity, Vol. 78, Issue 299. (2004), pp. 173–183.

External links
  at the EMuseum of the Minnesota State University, Mankato
  with Brian Fagan at the Society for California Archaeology
 Audio interview with National Review Online
 Brian Fagan books online
 Cro-Magnon: How the Ice Age Gave Birth to the First Modern Humans lecture at the Linda Hall Library, 29 March 2012

References

British anthropologists
British archaeologists
British social sciences writers
Science communicators
Science communication award winners
20th-century British scientists
21st-century British scientists
University of California, Santa Barbara faculty
British expatriate academics in the United States
Alumni of Pembroke College, Cambridge
People educated at Rugby School
1936 births
Living people